Brazilians in France number approximately 153,700 and form the largest immigrant group from Latin America in France. Nearly half of them live in French Guiana, including many who have crossed the border illegally.

History

Background 
The ancestral origins of the Brazilian nation show recent ancestors of generations predominantly as Italians and Portuguese, but with strong  African, Spanish, Japanese, German, British, French, Native American, Slavic and Semitic components, making most Brazilians able to join the European Union. However, they faced very different legal circumstances that Portugal and Italy had long before they joined the EU migration policy, thousands of people a day come to the consulates of Portugal to process the new nationality or obtain a visa; nevertheless, they are not the most numerous among Latin American immigrants in Europe.

Demographics
The 2012 Census recorded 64,622 Brazilian-born people.

Notable people

See also 

 Brazil–France relations
 Immigration to France
 French Brazilians

References 

 
France